August Gustaw Dehnel s. Michała (June 25, 1903, in Warsaw – November 22, 1962, in Warsaw) was a Polish zoologist, Ph.D. (1926), professor. Until 1949 he signed his popular science and embryology works with the name Gustaw Dehnel.

Dehnel was born in Warsaw, the son of Maria née Sliwicka and physician Michael Dehnel. After school he was conscripted and served in  Upper Silesia for which he received a medal of valour. He became a student of Jan Korczak Tur in the Institute of Comparative Anatomy from 1922. He obtained his doctorate in 1926 and became a senior assistant. He took an interest in teratological monstrosities in Emys orbicularis and later studied avian embryology. Along with Tur, they examined experimental approaches to embryonic development in fowl eggs and discovered that growth and development was highly regulated.

In 1935 he left work at Warsaw University and began to study the mammal fauna of Poland at the State Zoological Museum. He also worked on the management of beaver habitats. During World War II he was conscripted and taken prisoner by the Germans. He gave biology lectures at the prisoner-of-war camp in Grosborn. He returned to the Museum in May 1946 and a year later joined the Maria Curie-Sklodowska University at Lublin as an assistant professor. It was here that he conducted studies on Sorex shrews and seasonal variations in the size of their braincase. He found that it shrinks significantly over the winter and expands again in the spring. This has come to be known as the Dehnel phenomenon. It affects not only the brain, but also other major organs such as the liver and kidneys.  This factor explains why such small animals can survive harsh winters with associated reduction in food availability.  The phenomenon may be responsible for the preservation of certain rare populations such as the Suisun Shrew. For this discovery, reported in his habilitation thesis (1949) at the University of Warsaw, he received the State Award.

Dehnel also took a special interest in falconry and was among the last falconers in Poland. He admired the writings of Anatole France and Mikhail Sholohov.

Books 
 1960: "Maleńki ssak o dużej przyszłości" (popular science, about shrews)
 1949: "Zamki na wodzie" (popular science, about beavers)
 1947: "Najpospolitsze gryzonie i ich zwalczanie" ("Cost Common Rodents and the Fight against Them") (with E. Kaminski)
 1939: "O sztuce układania ptaków drapieżnych do łowów" ("About the Art of Upbringing of Birds of Prey for Hunting")

Decorations
1920: Cross of Valour, for the participation in the Polish-Soviet War (1918-1920)
1950:  of III degree
1954: Knight's Cross of the Order of Polonia Restituta
1954: Golden Cross of Merit (Poland)
1954: Medal of the 10th Anniversary of People's Poland

References

1903 births
1962 deaths
20th-century Polish zoologists
Knights of the Order of Polonia Restituta
University of Warsaw alumni 
Academic staff of the University of Warsaw